Bertram Dobell (9 January 1842 – 14 December 1914) was an English bookseller, literary scholar, editor, poet, essayist and publisher.

Biography 
Dobell was born in January 1842 in Battle, East Sussex to Edward, a tailor and his wife Elizabeth. He received little education and started work at a young age. Dobell married Eleanor Wymer (1847–1910) on 24 July 1869; they had five children.

Dobell opened a newsvendor's shop in 1872; he went on to become the proprietor of two bookshops in Charing Cross Road, which were well respected by contemporary book collectors. In addition to continuing "the good tradition which knits writers, printers, vendors, and purchasers of books together," Arthur Quiller-Couch wrote, Dobell was "at pains to make his second-hand catalogues better reading than half the new books printed, and they cost us nothing."

Dobell formed close friendships with a number of contemporary writers, most notably the poet James Thomson, whose poems he helped publish in book form.

Dobell died from liver cancer at his home in Haverstock Hill, London, in 1914, at the age of 72.

Works
As an author, Dobell was best known for his editions of the works of Thomas Traherne (whose unpublished manuscripts he had discovered), Shelley, Goldsmith, Strode and James Thomson.

At first, Dobell issued his books through other publishers, but after some collaborative ventures, he began publishing under his own imprint, beginning with a "cheaper and more popular" edition of Thomson's The City of Dreadful Night in 1899.

This was followed by a privately published collection of his own verse, Rosemary and Pansies (1901), which, after favorable reception, he reissued in expanded form in 1904. This received some praise for its satires and epigrams, and contained, as well, a dozen haikai, one of the first English experiments with the recently-imported Japanese poetic form afterward known as haiku.

Dobell's other books included A Century of Sonnets (1910), and the biographies Sidelights on Charles Lamb (1903) and The Laureate of Pessimism: a Sketch of the Life of James Thomson (1910).

References

External links 
 

1842 births
1914 deaths
19th-century English male writers
19th-century English poets
19th-century scholars
20th-century English male writers
20th-century English poets
20th-century scholars
Deaths from liver cancer
English book editors
English booksellers
English essayists
English publishers (people)
19th-century English businesspeople